FC Luninets is a Belarusian football club based in Luninets, Brest Region.

History
FC Luninets was founded in 1999 and joined Belarusian Second League the same year. The team quickly overshadowed local rivals Polesye Luninets (who were already playing in Second League for several seasons) and earned a promotion to the First League from the first attempt.

Luninets fought for the promotion in their debut First League season, but ultimately finished second, losing the race to Molodechno. At the end of the year the team folded due to lack of financing.

During their short history the team was led by coach Yakov Shapiro.

At some point after their withdrawal from the First League they started playing in Brest Oblast league as an amateur team. In 2021 they rejoined Belarusian Second League.

Current squad 
As of September 2022

References

Luninets
Football clubs in Belarus
Association football clubs established in 1999
Association football clubs disestablished in 2000
1999 establishments in Belarus
2000 disestablishments in Belarus